The Ukrainian Second League Cup 1999–00 was the first edition of Second League Cup competition designated exclusively for clubs of the Second League. It was organized as a qualification tournament for the Ukrainian Cup with only the finalist advancing to the national cup competition.

The Cup started with a qualification round on August 18, 1999, and consisted of 11 pairs. The winner of that round was identified by a single game and advancing to the first round of competition. The first round started on September 1. From the first round and all the way to the final teams played a home-away elimination type tournament. The best two teams faced off after qualifying for the main event. Both Borysfen and Kherson were eliminated in the second round of the Ukrainian Cup with a big margin on March 29, 2000. Later they met each other for the final of the Second League Cup on May 6, 2000, although the last semifinal game of that tournament took place on November 16, 1999. In the final that took place at the Dinamo Stadium in Kyiv Borysfen beat Kherson earning itself the first trophy of the competition.

Competition schedule

Qualification round

First round (of 32) 

|}

Second round (of 16) 

|}

Quarterfinals (1/4) 

|}

Semifinals (1/2) 

|}

Final 

The final was held at the Dynamo Stadium on May 6, 2000, in Kyiv.

Top goalscorers

See also 
 Ukrainian Cup 1999-2000

References

External links 
 Calendar of Matches—Schedule of the Ukrainian Cup. 

Ukrainian Second League Cup
Second League Cup
Ukrainian Second League Cup